José Jiménez Fernández (born 11 February 1943), commonly known as Joselito, is a former child singer and film star in Spain, primarily active during the 1950s and 1960s.

Career
Joselito was born in Beas de Segura (Jaén), northeast Andalucia in Spain. Joselito made his film debut at the age of 13 and began making other films, including The Little Nightingale, The Song of the Nightingale, The Nightingale in the Mountains, Listen To My Song, The Little Colonel, Aventuras de Joselito en América, The Two Little Rascals, Lovely Memory, and The White Horse with Antonio Aguilar. Besides acting, Joselito was a popular child singer with a very distinguished voice having sung such songs as "La Campanera", "Dónde estará mi vida", "Gorrioncillo pecho amarillo", "En un pueblito español", "Clavelitos", "Doce Cascabeles", "Las Golondrinas", "El Pastor", "Granada" and "Ave María". He toured several countries in his youth.

He was out of the public eye until adulthood, when he became a media entrepreneur. In 1990, he was arrested by Angolan authorities on charges of gun and drug trafficking. Subsequently, he was deported to Spain, where he was jailed. In 2002 La Jaula del Ruiseñor was released, an authorized biography of Joselito's life. There he wrote that jail was the best thing that had ever happened to him and that it had helped him to overcome his drug addiction as well as to give him a different outlook on life.

Upon his release, he has participated in the Spanish version of the Survivor television series, and collaborated on the movie Spanish Movie, and he is currently living in Utiel (Valencia).

Discography

Songs
(Selective)
"El ruiseñor" 
"La Campanera"
"Dónde estará mi vida"
"Gorrioncillo pecho amarillo"
"En un pueblito español"
"Clavelitos"
"Doce Cascabeles"
"Las Golondrinas"
"El Pastor"
"Granada"
"Ave María"

Filmography
(Selective)

References

External links

1943 births
Living people
Spanish male child actors
Spanish child singers
Spanish male singers
Singers from Andalusia
Male actors from Andalusia
Spanish male film actors